Szabolcs Horváth (born 10 July 1989 in Miskolc) is a Hungarian football player who currently plays for Diósgyőri VTK.

References
HLSZ 
MLSZ 

1989 births
Living people
Sportspeople from Miskolc
Hungarian footballers
Association football defenders
Diósgyőri VTK players
Vecsés FC footballers